From the Bottom Up is the debut studio album by American girl group Brownstone. It was released by Epic Records and Michael Jackson's MJJ Music on January 10, 1995 in the United States. Brownstone worked with a wide range of producers and songwriters on the album, including Jorge Corante, Dave "Jam" Hall, Soulshock & Karlin, and Gordon Chambers. From the Bottom Up spawned four singles, including the top 10 R&B hits "If You Love Me" and "Grapevyne," and a cover of The Eagles' "I Can't Tell You Why". In addition, "Sometimes Dancin'" was featured in the Free Willy 2: The Adventure Home soundtrack.

The album debuted at number 48 on the US Billboard 200 and peaked at number 29 on March 11, 1995. It spent 37 consecutive weeks on the  chart and earned a platinum certification from the Recording Industry Association of America (RIAA) on August 16, 1995. From the Bottom Up received critical acclaim and garnered several accolades, including a Grammy Award nomination for Best R&B Performance by a Duo or Group with Vocals for "If You Love Me," and five Billboard Music Award nominations, winning one for Top Hot R&B Single Airplay for "If You Love Me."

Critical reception

William Cooper from AllMusic called From the Bottom Up a "solid debut." He found that the album "showcases the group's considerable vocal talents, but Brownstone is somewhat distinctive in that the group's members also had a hand in writing their own material. Predictably, the album's songs alternate between R&B funk workouts and slinky slow jams, but the vocals rise above the material, making the album a delightful listen [...] From the Bottom Up is somewhat undermined by an overabundance of producers. But this doesn't take away from the quality of the songs and the solid vocal performances."

Track listing

Samples
"If You Love Me"  embodies portions of the composition "Spellbound" as performed by K-Solo.
"Sometimes Dancin'" contains elements from "Kamazaki" as performed by Prince Jammy.

Personnel
Adapted credits from the liner notes of From the Bottom Up.
Alan Yoshida – mastering (A&M Mastering Studios)
Jono Kohan – A&R (MJJ Music)
DAS Communications – management
Mary Mourer – art direction
Doug Erp – design
Warren Mantooth – photography
Cheri Grey – front cover/logo design

Charts

Weekly charts

Year-end charts

Certifications

References

1995 debut albums
Brownstone (group) albums
Albums produced by Soulshock and Karlin